Joseph Brennen Barksdale (born January 4, 1989) is an American singer-songwriter, electric guitar player, and former American football offensive tackle. Born in Detroit, Michigan he attended Louisiana State University on a full ride American football scholarship. He was drafted by the Oakland Raiders in the third round of the 2011 NFL Draft. He played college football at Louisiana State University. He also played for the St. Louis Rams, Los Angeles Chargers and Arizona Cardinals.

Music career
Barksdale began playing guitar in 2013, at the suggestion of his then head coach, Jeff Fisher. In January 2018, he released his first album Butterflies, Rainbows, & Moonbeams. Blues Rock Review called it  “an upbeat world, where funk and blues mingle, and where songs pop into existence, not because they fit within a certain genre, but because they’ll make the listener (and one suspects, the performer) happy. It’s also a world where an NFL tackle manages to create one of the more delightful, sincere records of 2018.” 

In April 2019, Joe released an EP titled, Electric Soul, produced by Narada Michael Walden.

In June 2019, Joe Barksdale hung up his cleats to pursue music full time.

In February 2020 he released single, "Black Majik" was described by Ryan Baltz of American Songwriter as, "dark and funky helping of shot-in-the-veins blues."

High school career
Barksdale attended Cass Technical High School in Detroit, Michigan, where he was a two-way lineman for coach Thomas Wilcher. He recorded 73 tackles (17 for losses), 14 hurries, seven quarterback sacks, one interception and three forced fumbles as a senior, and received High School All-American honors by Parade and USA Today. He also participated in the U.S. Army All-American Bowl as a member of the East team.

Considered a four-star recruit by Rivals.com, Barksdale was listed as the No. 6 defensive tackle prospect in the nation. He chose LSU over Michigan State, Notre Dame and Ohio State, becoming the first state of Michigan signee in LSU history.

College career
Barksdale graduated early from high school and enrolled at LSU in January 2007. Although recruited as a defensive tackle, he was switched to the offensive side of the ball during fall camp. As a true freshman in 2007 he played 14 games as a backup to Carnell Stewart at right tackle.

Following Stewart's graduation, Barksdale took over as right tackle and started all 13 games for the Tigers. He helped anchor an offensive line that paved the way for an LSU rushing attack that ranked No. 4 in the SEC with 166.7 yards per game. Barksdale and left tackle Ciron Black were regarded as "the best duo of tackles in SEC."

American Football career

Oakland Raiders
Barksdale was selected with the 92nd pick in the 2011 NFL Draft by the Oakland Raiders. He was released on September 26, 2012.

St. Louis Rams
The St. Louis Rams signed Barksdale on September 27, 2012. On October 21, 2012, Barksdale made his first NFL start at left tackle against the Green Bay Packers.

San Diego / Los Angeles Chargers
Barksdale signed a one-year contract with the San Diego Chargers on May 19, 2015. The deal worth the base minimum, with a $350,000 signing bonus, and up to $1,000,000 in incentives. In his first season as a Charger, he started all 16 games.

On March 7, 2016, Barksdale agreed to a four-year $22,000,000 contract extension and a signing bonus worth up to $4,000,000 with the Chargers.

In 2017, Barksdale started 11 games at right tackle, missing five games due to a foot injury.

Barksdale entered the 2018 season slated as the starting right tackle, however suffered a knee injury in Week 1 and missed the next five games. He returned in Week 7, but he was replaced in the starting lineup by Sam Tevi. He played in the next five games but remained out of the starting lineup. He was inactive in Week 13 before ultimately being released on December 3, 2018.

Arizona Cardinals
On December 5, 2018, Barksdale was signed by the Arizona Cardinals after D. J. Humphries was placed on injured reserve.

Personal life
Joseph married Brionna in March 2015. Barksdale is also a member of Omega Psi Phi fraternity. In 2018, Barksdale opened up regarding his struggles with depression. In 2022, he revealed an autism diagnosis.

References

External links

 
 LSU Tigers bio

1989 births
Living people
Players of American football from Detroit
Cass Technical High School alumni
American football offensive tackles
LSU Tigers football players
Oakland Raiders players
St. Louis Rams players
San Diego Chargers players
Los Angeles Chargers players
Arizona Cardinals players